A Hobson's choice is one that must be taken or left.

Hobson's Choice may also refer to:

Places
 Hobson's Choice (Woodbine, Maryland), an historic home in Howard County, Maryland, US
 Hobson's Choice (Alberta, Virginia), an historic home in Brunswick County, Virginia, US

Arts and entertainment
 Hobson's Choice (play), by Harold Brighouse (1915), which has been adapted numerous times:
 Hobson's Choice (1920 film), a silent film directed by Percy Nash
 Hobson's Choice (1931 film), directed by Thomas Bentley
 Hobson's Choice (1954 film), directed by David Lean
 Walking Happy, a 1966 Broadway musical by Jimmy Van Heusen
 Hobson's Choice, a 1983 television-movie directed by Gilbert Cates
 Hobson's Choice, a 1989 ballet by David Bintley

Literature
 "Hobson's Choice", a 1952 short story written by Alfred Bester
 The Terminal Experiment, a 1995 science fiction novel originally serialised under the title Hobson's Choice